Jinnah Courts, is a heritage building at Dr Ziauddin Ahmed Road, in the Civil Lines neighbourhood of Saddar, in South Karachi.

The building was built from 1932 to 1933. At that time, it was named the Leslie Wilson Muslim Hostel, but was renamed after  Mohammad Ali Jinnah. The building's heritage status is protected by the Sindh Cultural Heritage (Preservation) Act of 1994.

The Jinnah Courts is used since 1999 as the headquarters of the Sindh Rangers,  paramilitary federal law enforcement organization.

References

External Links

Buildings and structures in Karachi
Heritage sites in Karachi
British colonial architecture